Saphenista delicatulana is a species of moth of the  family Tortricidae. It is found in Colombia.

References

Moths described in 1877
Saphenista